Sarashtybash (Saraştıbaş) is a rural locality (a selo) in Kurdymsky Selsoviet, Tatyshlinsky District, Bashkortostan, Russia. The population was 189 as of 2010. There are 2 streets.

Geography 
Sarashtybash is located 30 km west of Verkhniye Tatyshly (the district's administrative centre) by road. 2-y Zirimzibash is the nearest rural locality.

References 

Rural localities in Tatyshlinsky District